Raffaele Palladino (born 17 April 1984) is an Italian professional football coach and former player who is head coach of  club Monza.

Club career
On 3 July 2008, Palladino was signed by Genoa in co-ownership deal, priced €5million (for 50% rights), joined along with defender Domenico Criscito on loan.

Parma
On 3 January 2011, Genoa's half share in Palladino was transferred to Parma in a move which saw Parma's half share in Alberto Paloschi go the other way and the exchange of the full registration of Francesco Modesto and Luca Antonelli. Genoa also paid a sum of €5.85M cash. Palladino's contract will run until 30 June 2014. 

In June 2011 Juventus gave up the remain 50% registration rights to Parma for free. 

In July 2013 he extended his contract to 30 June 2016.

Crotone
On 10 November 2015, he was signed by Crotone. He renewed his contract in July 2016.

Return to Genoa
On 31 January 2017, Palladino was re-signed by Genoa.

Monza 
On 31 March 2019, Monza announced the signing of Palladino.

International career
Palladinos made his debut at the age of 23, in a 3–1 home win against the Faroe Islands on 21 November 2007. He played as one of the three strikers along with Luca Toni and Vincenzo Iaquinta.

Managerial career 
Having coached Monza's youth sector since 2019, Palladino was appointed head coach of their Primavera (under-19) team on 9 July 2021. After having reached the semi-finals of the 2021–22 Campionato Primavera 2 (under-19) promotion play-offs, Monza renewed Palladino's contract for a further year in July 2022.

On 13 September 2022, Palladino was promoted head coach of Monza's first team following the dismissal of Giovanni Stroppa, with club CEO Adriano Galliani stating his appointment to be on a permanent basis. On his debut, Palladino guided Monza to their first ever top flight win, defeating Serie A powerhouse Juventus 1–0.

Style of play 
A left-footed player, he predominantly played as a winger, although he could also play as a forward, or as a second striker. He has also represented the Italy national side. He was known in particular for his excellent technical ability and dribbling skills, as well as his pace and agility on the ball, which allowed him to beat opposing players and create space for himself to get into positions from which he can strike on goal.

Career statistics

International

Managerial

Honours
Juventus Primavera
 Torneo di Viareggio: 2003, 2004

Juventus
 Serie B: 2006–07

Italy U19
 Under-19 European Championship: 2003

References

External links

 Lega Serie A profile 

Living people
1984 births
Sportspeople from the Province of Naples
Footballers from Campania
Italian footballers
Association football forwards
Benevento Calcio players
Juventus F.C. players
U.S. Salernitana 1919 players
U.S. Livorno 1915 players
Genoa C.F.C. players
Parma Calcio 1913 players
F.C. Crotone players
Spezia Calcio players
A.C. Monza players
Serie A players
Serie B players
Serie C players
Italy youth international footballers
Italy under-21 international footballers
Italy international footballers
Association football coaches
Italian football managers
A.C. Monza managers